The  is a commuter railway line in Hyōgo Prefecture, Japan, operated by the Kobe Electric Railway (Shintetsu). It connects Kobe with its northwestern suburb, Ono.

Between Suzurandai Station and Kizu Station, track gradient can reach 50‰ at most.

History
The Miki Electric Railway Co. opened the Suzurandai – Hirono Golf-jo-mae on 28 December 1936. DMUs operated until the section was electrified the following year and extended to Miki Uenomaru, with the extension to Miki opening in 1938.

In 1947 the company merged with the Kobe Electric Railway Co., which extended the line to Ono on 28 December 1951, and from Ono to Ao on 10 April 1952.

The Nishi-Suzurandai – Aina section was duplicated in 1982, and the Kizu – Oshibedani section was duplicated between 1979 and 1989.

Former connecting lines
 Miki station – The Miki Railway Miki Line operated between 1917 and 2008.

Stations 

 S indicates that the service stops at the station
  indicates that the service skips the station

References
This article incorporates material from the corresponding article in the Japanese Wikipedia

Transport in Kobe
Railway lines in Japan
1067 mm gauge railways in Japan
Railway lines opened in 1936